Nicolai Oliver Feldballe Petersen (born 3 April 1990) is a Danish former footballer.

Career
A promising winger, Feldballe made his Danish Superliga debut for his youth club OB in August 2009, after having been on trial at the English club Liverpool during his youth. He moved to Randers FC on a free transfer in the summer of 2011. After two seasons, he signed with Eredivisie club SC Cambuur.

In July 2014, Feldballe sign with Norwegian Tippeligaen club Sarpsborg 08.

In July 2015, Feldballe moved to Danish 1st Division (second-tier) club Fredericia. He left the club in the summer 2017.

On 1 August 2017, Feldballe signed with local Odense club, BK Marienlyst, competing in the Danish 2nd Division (third-tier). He retired from football in 2018.

References

External links

 Danish Superliga statistics
 Oliver Feldballe on FC Fredericia
 
 Alt om fotball profile
 Voetbal International profile 

Living people
1990 births
Danish men's footballers
Danish expatriate men's footballers
Odense Boldklub players
Randers FC players
Danish Superliga players
Eredivisie players
Danish 1st Division players
Danish 2nd Division players
SC Cambuur players
BK Marienlyst players
Expatriate footballers in the Netherlands
Association football defenders